Jamie Susskind (born 1989) is an English barrister and author.

Background 
Jamie Susskind is the son of Richard Susskind, a notable British author, and is Jewish. He grew up in Radlett, an affluent village in Hertfordshire, and received a private school education from the Haberdashers' Boys' School. Jamie was Head Boy, as well as captain of the debating team and member of the golf team. He studied history and politics at Oxford University. He later studied law and was appointed as a research fellow at Harvard's Berkman Klein Center for Internet and Society. Jamie practises law at Littleton Chambers.

Writings 
In 2011, Susskind's first book, Karl Marx and British Intellectuals in the 1930s was published.

Susskind's second book Future Politics: Living Together in a World Transformed by Tech, was listed by the London School of Economics as one of the top ten books of 2019. In the book, Susskind approaches the issues of technological change in the political arena from a legal standpoint, speculating on the various ways technology would change the interactions between citizens and the political process. It was awarded Book of the Year by Evening Standard and Prospect Magazine, Book of the Day by The Guardian and received the 2019 Estoril Global Issues Distinguished Book Prize.

His third book, The Digital Republic: On Freedom and Democracy in the 21st Century, was published in 2022.  It concerns the dangers, problems, and solutions to Big Tech.

In a 2022 opinion piece on the rideshare startup Uber, Susskind argues that emerging technologies must be used for human good.

Bibliography 
 Karl Marx and British Intellectuals in the 1930s, Davenant Press, Oxford, 2011. 
 Future politics: living together in a world transformed by tech, Oxford University Press, Oxford, United Kingdom, 2018. 
 The digital republic : on freedom and democracy in the 21st century, Pegasus Books, New York, 2022.

References 

Living people
English barristers
British technology writers
1989 births